Hercules the Avenger is a 1965 Italian adventure film directed by Maurizio Lucidi. It was composed mostly of re-edited stock footage from Reg Park's two 1961 Hercules films, Hercules at the Conquest of Atlantis and Hercules in the Haunted World.

Cast
Reg Park as Hercules
Gia Sandri as Queen Leda
Giovanni Cianfriglia as Anteo
Adriana Ambesi (credited as Audrey Amber) as Deyanira
Luigi Barbini as Xantos
Gianni Solaro as Teseo
Franco Ressel as Eteocles
Luigi Donato as Timoniere

Production
The screenplay author for the film is billed as Enzo Gicca, which is an alias for Lorenzo Gicca Palli. Hercules the Avenger consists mostly of footage from Hercules in the Haunted World and Hercules and the Captive Women.

Release
Hercules the Avenger was released in Italy on 13 August 1965.

References

Footnotes

Sources

External links
 

1965 films
1960s fantasy films
Italian fantasy films
1960s Italian-language films
Sword and sorcery films
Peplum films
Films directed by Maurizio Lucidi
Sword and sandal films
1965 directorial debut films
1960s Italian films